Bombylius helvus is a species of North American bee flies. It was first described by Christian Rudolph Wilhelm Wiedemann in 1821.

References

Bombyliidae
Insects described in 1821
Diptera of North America
Taxa named by Christian Rudolph Wilhelm Wiedemann